When the Lights Go Out was a 1988 album by American singer/actress Pia Zadora. The album was reissued in July 2014 as a 2-CD set.

Background
The set was produced by Jimmy Jam and Terry Lewis in 1987 and was intended to be released in the United States on Epic Records, but those plans were scrapped and was instead released in Europe through CBS Records, where it failed to chart in that region. Its only release from that album, "Dance Out Of My Head," peaked at number 65 in the United Kingdom.

On July 28, 2014, US label Funky Town Grooves reissued the album in a 2-CD set, with the entire tracks remastered on one CD while the second CD contained 6 unreleased remixed versions of "Dance Out of My Head" and 5 unreleased remixes of "Heartbeat of Love" from the Pia Z album. This marked the first time that the album was released in the United States since Epic's decision to shelve the release stateside.

Track listing
All tracks composed by James Harris III and Terry Lewis

1988 and 2014 reissue
 "I Don't Wanna Love" (4:26)	
 "Still Remembered" (4:37)	
 "Dance Out of My Head" (4:39)	
 "Laughin' at You" (3:54)	
 "When the Lights Go Out" (4:14)	
 "Pia's Interlude" (0:25)	
 "I Really Like You (Not Him)" (5:04)	
 "Silence" (3:40)	
 "Since I've Been Lovin' You" (4:40)	
 "Pia's Theme" (1:49)	
 "It's Always the Same" (5:23)

2014 reissue (CD2 remixes)
 "Dance Out of My Head" (The Dressed Down Mix)
 "Dance Out of My Head" (House Groove Mix)
 "Dance Out of My Head" (Jam & Lewis Remix)
 "Dance Out of My Head" (Ben Liebrand Mix)
 "Dance Out of My Head" (Dub version)
 "Dance Out of My Head" (7" version)
 "Heartbeat of Love" (7" version)
 "Heartbeat of Love" (C&C Club Mix)
 "Heartbeat of Love" (C&C Dub Mix)
 "Heartbeat of Love" (Freestyle Club Mix)
 "Heartbeat of Love" (The DJ's Bonus Beats)

Personnel
Pia Zadora – lead vocals
Jimmy Jam – drum and keyboard programming, digital and analog keyboards, acoustic piano, percussion
Terry Lewis – drum programming, acoustic and electric basses, guitars, percussion

References

External links
Video for "Dance Out Of My Head" from YouTube

1988 albums
Pia Zadora albums
Albums produced by Jimmy Jam and Terry Lewis
Epic Records albums
Dance-pop albums by American artists